Dwaraka Ravi Teja is an Indian first-class cricketer plays for Meghalaya and previously for Andhra and Hyderabad. He was also a member of IPL team Deccan Chargers (2008-2012) and Sunrisers Hyderabad(2013). He was part of under-19 India team and also India A squad.

References

Living people
1987 births
Indian cricketers
South Zone cricketers
Hyderabad cricketers
Deccan Chargers cricketers
Sunrisers Hyderabad cricketers
People from Kakinada
Cricketers from Andhra Pradesh